Mitrevski is a surname. Notable people with the surname include:

 Darko Mitrevski (born 1971), Macedonian film director
 Nikola Mitrevski (born 1985) Macedonian handball player
 Paskal Mitrevski (1912–1978), Greek communist partisan
 Radoslav Mitrevski (born 1981), Bulgarian footballer
 Risto Mitrevski (born 1991), Macedonian footballer

See also
 Mitreski, surname

Macedonian-language surnames